Ab Dang Sar (also Romanized as Āb Dang Sar) is a village in Sharq va Gharb-e Shirgah Rural District, North Savadkuh County, Mazandaran Province, Iran. At the 2006 census, its population was 266, in 59 families.

References 

Populated places in Savadkuh County